Vimalbai Panjabrao Deshmukh (27 October 1906 – 25 March 1998) was an Indian politician in the state of Maharashtra who belonged to the INC party. She was the wife of Dr Panjabrao Deshmukh, India's first Cabinet Minister for Agriculture.

Deshmukh represented the Maharashtra state in the Rajya Sabha, the Council of States of India parliament from 1967 to 1972. She died on 25 March 1998, at the age of 91.

References

1906 births
1988 deaths
Rajya Sabha members from Maharashtra
Women members of the Lok Sabha
Women members of the Rajya Sabha
Indian National Congress politicians from Maharashtra